Chandur Biswa is a village in Nandura tehsil of Buldhana district, Maharashtra State, India.

Demographics

Administration
The village has a gram panchayat. The village's post office PIN code is 443401 and PIN is shared with the Dhanora Vitali, Jigaon, Mamulwadi, and Mominabad post offices.

Transport
The village has a railway station, named Biswa Bridge, located between Nandura and Malkapur on the Bhusawal – Nagpur section of Bhusawal division of Central Railway.

References

Villages in Buldhana district